The 2020 Indiana Senate election was held on November 3, 2020 as a part of the biennial elections in the U.S. state of Indiana, coinciding with other elections in the state, including for U.S. president, U.S. House, Indiana governor, and Indiana House, as well as various other state and local elections. Voters elected members to 25 of the 50 seats in the Indiana Senate to serve four-year terms in single-member constituencies. Primary elections were held on June 2.

Following the election, the Republican Party retained supermajority control of the Senate, losing one seat to the Democratic Party in the process.

Retirements 
Two incumbents did not seek re-election in 2020.
District 20: Victoria Spartz (R) retired to run for U.S. House.
District 40: Mark Stoops (D) retired.

Incumbents defeated 
One incumbent lost re-election.
District 30: John Ruckelshaus (R) lost to Fady Qaddoura (D).

Predictions

Results

Overview

Close races 
Two districts had a margin of victory under 10%:
District 30, 5.13% gain
District 36, 7.74%

District 2

District 3

District 5

District 7

District 8

District 9

District 10

District 12

District 13

District 16

District 18

District 20

District 24

District 28

District 30

District 32

District 33

District 34

District 35

District 36

District 37

District 40

District 42

District 44

District 50

Footnotes

Notes

References

See also 
 2020 Indiana elections
 2020 Indiana House of Representatives election

2020 Indiana Senate
Indiana Senate
Indiana Senate